The EL class are a class of diesel locomotives built by A Goninan & Co, Broadmeadow for Australian National in 1990–1991.

History
In June 1989, Australian National awarded a contract for 14 Dash 8 locomotives to A Goninan & Co with the first delivered in July 1990. Even though they were the most powerful locomotives to have operated by Australian National, they were fitted with lightweight traction motors which reduced their tractive effort by 33% compared to the preceding DL class locomotives. They were ordered for use on passenger and fast freight services and geared for a top speed of 140 km/h.

They regularly hauled The Ghan and Indian Pacific until replaced by CLP class locomotives in 1994. They were transferred to National Rail, however, following the delivery of the NR class, 13 were returned to Australian National and by November 1997 were stored at Islington Railway Workshops. The 14th had been destroyed in an accident at Mount Christie in February 1997. Six were briefly hired to Australian Southern Railroad in late 1997.

In November 1998, the remaining 13 were sold to Chicago Freight Car Leasing Australia. All were overhauled by A Goninan & Co, Bassendean, during which they were re-geared, reducing their top speed to 125 km/h, but resulting in their tractive effort increasing by 19%. All have been repainted into Chicago Freight Car Leasing Australia's yellow, blue and silver livery and named after famous Australian racehorses. They have been leased to a variety of operators and have run in all mainland states.

Status Table

References

Co-Co locomotives
Pacific National diesel locomotives
Railway locomotives introduced in 1990
Standard gauge locomotives of Australia
Diesel-electric locomotives of Australia